In Greek mythology, Marpessa  ("the robbed one") was an Aetolian princess and a granddaughter of Ares.

Family 
Marpessa was the daughter of King Evenus of Aetolia (son of Ares either by Demonice or Sterope) and princess Alcippe (daughter of King Oenomaus of Pisa). She attracted the attention of the hero Idas as well as the god Apollo. Marpessa eventually married Idas, by whom she begot Cleopatra, the future wife of the hero Meleager.

Mythology 

Marpessa was a beautiful lady, described as being "fair-ankled". Idas, son of King Aphareus, came from Messenia to ask for the hand of Marpessa, but Evenus refused his request because he wanted his daughter to remain a virgin. Idas went to his father Poseidon and begged for the use of a winged chariot. After Poseidon consented to his use of the chariot, Idas kidnapped Marpessa and carried her away from a band of dancers and to Pleuron in Aetolia. Her father, after chasing the couple for a long time, realized that he could not catch up to them. In his madness, he killed his horses and then drowned himself in a nearby river Lycormas and became immortal. The river was named later after him.

In other version, Apollo also wanted Marpessa and pursued Idas as he carried away Marpessa. As the two fought for the girl's hand, Zeus intervened and asked Marpessa to choose between the mortal and the god. Marpessa chose Idas, reasoning to Apollo that had she chosen the god, she would have eventually grown old and lost his affections.

In Homer's version, Marpessa was already married to Idas when Apollo carried her away from her husband. Idas, however, confronted Apollo: 
Idas that was mightiest of men that were then upon the face of earth;who also took his bow to face the king Phoebus Apollofor the sake of the fair-ankled maid [i.e. Marpessa].

When Idas was slain by the hands of Polydeuces, one of the Dioscuri, Marpessa killed herself.

Modern use of the name 
 Marpessa, as a name, was used to describe a 206,000 ton Shell Oil company supertanker (VLCC). In December 1969, it became the world's largest oil tanker to sink up to that date. Marpessa had been on its maiden voyage from Europort, Rotterdam, when an explosion ripped through the hull and it foundered 50 miles off the west coast of Africa.

Notes

References 

 Apollodorus, The Library with an English Translation by Sir James George Frazer, F.B.A., F.R.S. in 2 Volumes, Cambridge, MA, Harvard University Press; London, William Heinemann Ltd. 1921. ISBN 0-674-99135-4. Online version at the Perseus Digital Library. Greek text available from the same website.
 Bacchylides, Odes translated by Diane Arnson Svarlien. 1991. Online version at the Perseus Digital Library.
 Bacchylides, The Poems and Fragments. Cambridge University Press. 1905. Greek text available at the Perseus Digital Library.
 Homer, The Iliad with an English Translation by A.T. Murray, Ph.D. in two volumes. Cambridge, MA., Harvard University Press; London, William Heinemann, Ltd. 1924. . Online version at the Perseus Digital Library.
 Homer, Homeri Opera in five volumes. Oxford, Oxford University Press. 1920. . Greek text available at the Perseus Digital Library.
 Lucius Mestrius Plutarchus, Moralia with an English Translation by Frank Cole Babbitt. Cambridge, MA. Harvard University Press. London. William Heinemann Ltd. 1936. Online version at the Perseus Digital Library. Greek text available from the same website.
 Lucius Mestrius Plutarchus, Morals translated from the Greek by several hands. Corrected and revised by. William W. Goodwin, PH. D. Boston. Little, Brown, and Company. Cambridge. Press Of John Wilson and son. 1874. 5. Online version at the Perseus Digital Library.
 Pausanias, Description of Greece with an English Translation by W.H.S. Jones, Litt.D., and H.A. Ormerod, M.A., in 4 Volumes. Cambridge, MA, Harvard University Press; London, William Heinemann Ltd. 1918. . Online version at the Perseus Digital Library
Pausanias, Graeciae Descriptio. 3 vols. Leipzig, Teubner. 1903.  Greek text available at the Perseus Digital Library.
Sextus Propertius, Elegies from Charm. Vincent Katz. trans. Los Angeles. Sun & Moon Press. 1995. Online version at the Perseus Digital Library. Latin text available at the same website.

External links

Children of Potamoi
Women of Apollo
Mortal parents of demigods in classical mythology
Women in Greek mythology
Aetolian characters in Greek mythology